Lefroy may refer to:

People
 Harold Maxwell-Lefroy (1877–1925), Canadian entomologist
 Helena Lefroy (1820–1908), Irish botanist
 Henry Maxwell Lefroy (1818–1879), explorer of Western Australia 
 Jeremy Lefroy  (born 1959), British Conservative Party politician and Member of Parliament
 John Henry Lefroy (1817–1890), British military officer, colonial administrator, and scientist
 Thomas Langlois Lefroy (1776–1869), Irish politician and judge, neighbour and love interest of Jane Austen
 Anthony Lefroy (MP) (1800–1890), son of Thomas Langlois Lefroy and Irish Member of Parliament
 Anthony O'Grady Lefroy (1816–1897), nephew of Thomas Langlois Lefroy and Colonial Treasurer of Western Australia
 Henry Lefroy (1854–1930), 11th Premier of Western Australia and son of Anthony O'Grady Lefroy

Places
Lake Lefroy, a salt lake in Western Australia named for Henry Maxwell Lefroy
Lefroy Airport, in Ontario, Canada
Mount Lefroy, mountain in Canada named for John Henry Lefroy
Lefroy, Tasmania, a locality in Australia